Bredenbek is a small river of Schleswig-Holstein and Hamburg, Germany. It flows into the Alster near Hamburg-Bergstedt.

See also
List of rivers of Hamburg
List of rivers of Schleswig-Holstein

Rivers of Hamburg
Rivers of Schleswig-Holstein
Rivers of Germany